The Rev. Samuel Johnson (24 June 1846 – 29 April 1901) was an Anglican priest and historian of the Yoruba.

Biography
Samuel Johnson was born a recaptive Creole in Freetown, Sierra Leone, as the third of seven children of Henry Erugunjinmi Johnson and Sarah Johnson on June 24, 1846. His father, who gave himself the  Yoruba name Erugunjinmi, was born in 1810 in the town of Oyo-Ile, capital of the Oyo Empire. Henry was an Omoba (prince) of the Oyo clan, and was a grandson of the 18th-century alaafin (king) Abiodun. He was later captured in the Atlantic Slave Trade but fortunately was rerouted to Sierra Leone, like many Yorubas, such as Samuel Ajayi Crowther (his distant cousin) and others. He later met Samuel Johnson, whose name he gave to his son. Johnson had 2 older brothers, Henry and Nathaniel, and a younger brother, Obadiah. Henry and Nathaniel both became missionaries and archdeacons like Samuel, while Obadiah became the first indigenous Yoruba medical doctor. He completed his education at the Church Missionary Society (CMS) Training Institute and subsequently taught during what became known as the Yoruba civil war.

Johnson and Charles Phillips, also of the CMS, arranged a ceasefire in 1886 and then a treaty that guaranteed the independence of the Ekiti towns. Ilorin refused to cease fighting however, and the war dragged on. 
In 1880, he became a deacon and in 1888 a priest. He was based in Oyo from 1881 onward and completed a work on Yoruba history in 1897. This event is said to have been caused by him fearing that his people were losing their history, and that they were beginning to know European history better. Ironically, this work was misplaced by his British publishers.

After his death, his brother Dr. Obadiah Johnson re-compiled and rewrote the book, using the reverend's copious notes as a guide. In 1921, he released it as A History of the Yorubas from the Earliest Times to the Beginning of the British Protectorate. The book has since been likened to The Decline and Fall of the Roman Empire by Edward Gibbon.

Bibliography
 .
 .

References

External links

Hope Africa E-publisher
Site on Samuel Johnson
Brief mention of him

Sierra Leone Creole people
19th-century Nigerian historians
Nigerian Anglican priests
Sierra Leonean Anglicans
1846 births
1901 deaths
Yoruba Christian clergy
Yoruba historians
19th-century Christian clergy
Yoruba royalty
Historians of Yoruba
Abiodun family
Saro people
People from colonial Nigeria